This article contains information about the literary events and publications of 1717.

Events
January – Three Hours After Marriage, a stage play by Alexander Pope, John Gay and John Arbuthnot, mocks the poet and critic John Dennis as "Sir Tremendous Longinus the Critic", Anne Finch, Countess of Winchilsea as "Clinkett the Poetess" and Colley Cibber as "Plotwell". The play encounters massive criticism and has a short run, which mortifies Pope. In February, Dennis publishes his critical Remarks upon Mr. Pope's Translation of Homer to which in May Thomas Parnell retorts with Homer's Battle of the Frogs and Mice. With the Remarks of Zolius. To which is prefixed, the Life of the said Zolius, after which Dennis and Pope are reconciled for a decade.
March 2 – Ballet master John Weaver revives the pantomime genre at the Theatre Royal, Drury Lane, in London with The Loves of Mars and Venus – a new Entertainment in Dancing after the manner of the Antient Pantomimes and Perseus and Andromeda.
March 27 – Actress Adrienne Lecouvreur is invited to join the Comédie-Française in Paris, performing first in the title rôle of Prosper Jolyot de Crébillon's Electre.
April 22 – At Lincoln's Inn Fields Theatre in London, the actor-manager John Rich introduces the character of Harlequin into pantomimes.
May 16 – Voltaire is sentenced to eleven months in the Bastille and banished from Paris for criticizing the Duc D'Orléans. While in prison he writes his first play, Oedipe ("Oedipus").
unknown dates
The last two volumes of Antoine Galland's Les mille et une nuits are published posthumously in Lyon of the first translation of One Thousand and One Nights into a European language, including the first translation of the story of Ali Baba.
The Irish poet Hugh MacCurtin (Aodh Buidhe Mac Cuirtin)'s A brief discourse in vindication of the antiquity of Ireland, out of many authentick Irish histories and chronicles (based on Geoffrey Keating's History of Ireland) is published in Dublin. The author is imprisoned in the city about this time.

New books

Prose
Joseph Addison, John Dryden, Laurence Eusden, Sir Samuel Garth, John Gay, Alexander Pope, Nicholas Rowe and others – Ovid's Metamorphoses
Laurent d'Arvieux – Voyage dans la Palestine
Elias Ashmole – Memoirs
John Durant Breval – The Art of Dress
Susanna Centlivre – An Epistle to the King of Sweden
Anthony Collins – A Philosophical Inquiry Concerning Human Liberty
John Dennis – Remarks upon Mr. Pope's Translation of Homer
Benjamin Hoadly – The Nature of the Kingdom, or Church of Christ (part of the Bangorian Controversy)
Jane Holt – A Fairy Tale
William Law – The Bishop Bangor's Late Sermon (answer to Hoadly)
Matthew Prior – The Dove
John Quincy – Lexicon Physico-medicum
Richard Savage – The Convocation; or, A Battle of Pamphlets (satire on the Bangorian Controversy)
Thomas Tickell – An Epistle from a Lady in England
John Toland – The State-Anatomy of Great Britain
Joseph Trapp – The Real Nature of the Church or Kingdom of Christ (part of the Bangorian Controversy)

Drama
John Durant Breval (as Mr. Gay) – The Confederates (attack on John Gay, Alexander Pope, and the other members of the Scriblerus Club)
Susanna Centlivre – The Cruel Gift
Colley Cibber – The Non-Juror
Charles Johnson – The Sultaness
Delarivière Manley – Lucius, the First Christian King of Britain
Alexander Pope, John Gay and John Arbuthnot – Three Hours After Marriage
William Taverner
The Artful Husband
The Artful Wife
Pedro Calderón de la Barca – Autos sacramentales, alegóricos e historiales del insigne poeta español

Poetry

Wentworth Dillon, 4th Earl of Roscommon – Poems by the Earl of Roscomon [sic]
Elijah Fenton – Poems on Several Occasions
Thomas Parnell – Homer's Battle of the Frogs and Mice
Alexander Pope
The Iliad of Homer vol. iii
The Works of Mr. Alexander Pope (with new material)
Thomas Traherne – Hexameron (on creationism)
Leonard Welsted – Palaemon to Caelia, at Bath
Ned Ward
British Wonders
A Collection of Historical and State Poems
Eugenio Gerardo Lobo – Selva de las musas

Births
c. February 11 – William Williams Pantycelyn, Welsh religious writer and hymnist (died 1791)
February 14 – Richard Owen Cambridge, English poet (died 1802)
February 19 – David Garrick, English actor and playwright (died 1779)
September 24 – Horace Walpole, English man of letters (died 1797)
November 16 – Jean le Rond d'Alembert, French mathematician and encyclopedist (died 1783)
November 25 (November 14 OS) – Alexander Sumarokov, Russian dramatist (died 1777)
December 9 – Johann Joachim Winckelmann, German art historian (died 1768)
December 16 – Elizabeth Carter, English poet, writer and translator (died 1806)

Deaths
January 6 – Lambert Bos, Dutch scholar and critic (born 1670)
March 3 – Pierre Allix, French religious writer (born 1641)
June 9 – Jeanne Guyon, French writer and mystic (born 1648)
September – Casimir Oudin, French monk and bibliographer (born 1638)
Unknown dates
William Diaper, English poet (born 1685)
Ahmed ibn Nasir, Moroccan Sufi writer and teacher (born 1647)

References

 
Years of the 18th century in literature